Daniel Peter De Silva (born 6 March 1997) is an Australian professional football player who plays as an attacking midfielder for Macarthur FC in the A-League.

Born in Perth, De Silva commenced his professional career for Perth Glory in the A-League before joining Roda JC in 2015.

De Silva has played for Australia numerous times at youth level, and has been called up for the Australian senior team, but is yet to make his debut.

Club career

Perth Glory
On 22 February 2013, Daniel De Silva signed professional youth contract for Perth Glory. De Silva chose to sign for Perth after a deal with English Premier League side Everton fell through due to complications obtaining a visa. On 2 March 2013, De Silva made his professional debut for Perth Glory aged 15, in the 2–1 home victory against Sydney FC. De Silva came on as a 62nd-minute substitute for Matías Córdoba, making him the second youngest player in A-league history. On 29 October 2014, he scored his first senior goal in the FFA Cup Quarter Final against Melbourne Victory in the first period of extra time.

AS Roma
On 13 June 2014, Serie A side Roma announced that De Silva would join them at the conclusion of the 2014–15 A-League season for an undisclosed fee, rumoured to be A$2.5m. The transfer was cancelled in August 2015 after Perth Glory did not receive the first installment of the agreed transfer fee.

Roda JC
On 26 August, Perth Glory announced that De Silva had joined Roda JC on a two-year loan deal.

In January 2017, De Silva's loan was cut short six months early.

Central Coast Mariners
De Silva joined A-League side Central Coast Mariners in July 2017 on a three-year contract. Daniel De Silva made his first competitive debut for the Mariners in the FFA Cup against Blacktown City, coming on as a substitute in the 86th minute.

Sydney FC
De Silva spent a year on loan at Sydney FC. He frequently came on as a sub.

International career
De Silva scored his first goal for the Australia U20's in a man of the match performance against Colombia during the 2013 FIFA U-20 World Cup in a 1–1 draw.

De Silva was also included in Ange Postecoglou's initial 43-man squad for the 2015 AFC Asian Cup.

Honours
Macarthur
Australia Cup: 2022

References

External links

1997 births
Living people
Australian soccer players
Association football midfielders
A-League Men players
National Premier Leagues players
Eredivisie players
Perth Glory FC players
Roda JC Kerkrade players
Central Coast Mariners FC players
Sydney FC players
Macarthur FC players
Sportsmen from Western Australia
Australia youth international soccer players
Australia under-20 international soccer players
Australian expatriate soccer players
Expatriate footballers in the Netherlands
Soccer players from Perth, Western Australia
Marquee players (A-League Men)
Australian people of Portuguese descent